Dorothy Helen Hatfield OBE FRAeS née McRither (b.1940), aeronautical engineer, was the first female engineering apprentice at Vickers-Armstrongs (Aircraft), Brooklands. She became President of the Women's Engineering Society and was instrumental in setting up the Daphne Jackson Trust and the Lady Finniston Award for first year female engineering students. Hatfield was appointed an OBE for services to engineering in 2014.

Life and career 

Hatfield left school at 16 and successfully applied to be an engineering apprentice at Vickers-Armstrongs (Aircraft) Ltd, Brooklands, the first women to do so. After six years, she graduated with a first class honours degree in aeronautical engineering.

Hatfield returned to work after a career break to work in the flight simulation industry. She joined the Women's Engineering Society in 1962 and was elected president in 1990. She was made a Fellow of the Royal Aeronautical Society in 1996.

Recognition 
For her work with the Women's Engineering Society, Hatfield was awarded the Isabel Hardwich Medal in 2007.

References

Further reading 
https://electrifyingwomen.org/wp-content/uploads/sites/56/2020/05/Dorothy-Hatfield-BIO.pdf

1940 births
Living people
Aeronautical engineers
British women engineers
Presidents of the Women's Engineering Society
Fellows of the Royal Aeronautical Society
Officers of the Order of the British Empire
20th-century women engineers
Women's Engineering Society